Punta de Vacas Heliport  is a high elevation heliport at Punta de Vacas, a hamlet in the Mendoza Province of Argentina. Punta de Vacas is on the National Route 7 highway in the narrow mountain valley of the Mendoza River.

There is close mountainous terrain in all quadrants.

See also

Transport in Argentina
List of airports in Argentina

References

External links 
OpenStreetMap - Punta de Vacas
OurAirports - Punta de Vacas Airport

Airports in Argentina
Mendoza Province